Netechma chytrostium is a species of moth of the family Tortricidae. It is endemic to Ecuador (Morona-Santiago Province).

The ground colour of the forewings is dirty cream tinged with greyish in the costal area, dotted with blackish. The hindwings are whitish brown, but grey terminally.

Etymology
The species name refers to shape of the ostium and is derived from Greek chytr (meaning pot).

References

External links

Moths described in 2006
Endemic fauna of Ecuador
Fauna of Ecuador
chytrostium
Moths of South America
Insects of South America